Wurzbach is a town in Thuringia, Germany.

Wurzbach may also refer to:

 Würzbach, a river of Saarland, Germany
 Wurzbach Parkway, a part freeway and part major arterial road in San Antonio, Texas

People with the surname
 Alfred von Wurzbach (1846–1915), Austrian official and historian; son of Constantin von Wurzbach
 Constantin von Wurzbach (1818–1893), Austrian librarian, lexicographer and writer
 Harry M. Wurzbach (1874–1931), American politician
  (1809–1886), lawyer, politician, governor and state president of Carniola
 Wolfgang von Wurzbach (1879–1957), Austrian linguist, literary scholar and collector

See also
 Wurzbacher
 Würzbach